Air Marshal Stephen Charles Strafford,  (21 November 1898 – 18 May 1966) was a pilot in the Royal Naval Air Service during the First World War and a senior officer in the Royal Air Force during the Second World War and the following years.

RAF career
Strafford was commissioned into the Royal Naval Air Service in 1917 during the First World War. He was promoted to flight lieutenant in 1924. In 1930 he became a Flight Commander with No. 6 Squadron. He served in the Second World War as Officer Commanding the Advanced Headquarters (North) of the British Air Forces in France before becoming Deputy Director of Plans at the Air Ministry in 1940. He was made Head British Air Planner for the Combined Chiefs of Staff in Washington D. C. in 1941, before joining the staff of the Chief of Staff to the Supreme Allied Commander (COSSAC) in 1943 and becoming Chief of Plans and Operations for Supreme Headquarters Allied Expeditionary Force in 1944. After serving as the Air Officer Administration at Middle East Command, Strafford was appointed Air Officer Commanding Air HQ Iraq and Persia in July 1945.

After the War he became Senior Air Staff Officer at Headquarters RAF Bomber Command before becoming Commandant-General of the RAF Regiment in 1950 and Inspector-General of the RAF in 1952. Strafford was one of the representatives of the RAF at the funeral of King George VI. He retired in 1954.

References

|-

|-

|-

1898 births
1966 deaths
Recipients of the Bronze Medal of Military Valor
Commanders of the Order of the British Empire
Companions of the Order of the Bath
English aviators
Recipients of the Legion of Honour
Recipients of the Croix de Guerre 1939–1945 (France)
Recipients of the Distinguished Flying Cross (United Kingdom)
Royal Air Force air marshals
Military personnel from Gloucestershire
Royal Air Force personnel of World War II
Royal Naval Air Service aviators
Royal Naval Air Service personnel of World War I